Indexed search, also called the cutpoint method, is an algorithm for discrete-distribution pseudo-random number sampling, invented by Chen and Asau in 1974.

References

Sources

Fishman,G.S. (1996) Monte Carlo. Concepts, Algorithms, and Applications. New York: Springer.
Ripley, B. D. (1987) Stochastic Simulation. Wiley. 

Non-uniform random numbers